The Temple of Antas is an ancient Carthaginian-Roman temple in the commune of Fluminimaggiore, southern Sardinia, Italy. It is located in an area colonised by the Carthaginians and then by the Romans, attracted by its silver and lead deposits.

It consists of a Roman temple, under whose steps are the remains of the Carthaginian one, which was dedicated to the god Sid Addir, a later incarnation of the local god Sardus Pater Babai, the main male divinity of the Nuragic civilization.

The original temple had been built around 500 BC over a sacred limestone outcrop, and restored around 300 BC. The Roman temple was built by emperor Augustus (27 BC - 14 AD) and restored under Caracalla (213-217 AD). If still in use by the 4th-and 5th century, it would have been closed during the persecution of pagans in the late Roman Empire.  

Its remains were discovered in 1836 by general Alberto La Marmora, and rebuilt to the current status in 1967.

The fore section of the temple includes six columns, with a height of some 8 metres, with Ionic capitals. Originally a triangular pediment was also present. The cella was accessed through two side openings and had a mosaic-covered pavement, part of which has been preserved. The temple was provided with two square reservoirs, which housed the water for the sacred rites of purification.

It is likely that a statue of the Sardus Pater was housed in the cella. According to the size of the only remain found, a finger, it has been estimated that it was some 3 metres high.

The archaeological area of temple includes a small necropolis, remains of an ancient Nuragic village (13th-10th centuries BC), Roman quarries of limestone and an ancient path connecting the temple to a sacred cave where the water cult was practised.

See also
List of Ancient Roman temples

References

External links
Italian page about the temple 
Sassari, Fluminimaggiore, tempio di Antas 

Bagnolo, V.; Argiolas, R.; Cuccu, A. (31 January 2019). 
Bernardini, Paolo; Ibba, Antonio. "Il santuario di Antas fra Cartagine e Roma", in:  J. Cabrero Piquero e L. Montecchio (cur.), Sacrum nexum: alianzas entre el poder político y la religión en el mundo romano, Madrid-Salamanca 2015, pp. 75-138 .
The temple of Sardus Pater
The Punic-Roman Temple of Antas, Sardinia

1st-century BC religious buildings and structures
Buildings and structures in Sardinia
Antas
Carthage
Archaeological sites in Sardinia
Tourist attractions in Sardinia
Roman sites of Sardinia
Temples in Italy